Robert James Brown (1792–1872) was a Scottish minister, who served as Moderator of the General Assembly for the Free Church of Scotland 1846/47. He was familiarly known by his students as the Dorian.

Life

He was born in Utrecht in the Netherlands on 23 December 1792 the third son of Rev Dr William Laurence Brown (1755–1830), sometime Professor of Divinity at Aberdeen, and his wife, Ann Elizabeth Brown (William's first cousin). He studied Divinity under his father at Marischal College in Aberdeen.

He was licensed to preach by the Church of Scotland in 1812. He was ordained into the church at Drumblade in 1821. In 1827 he was appointed Professor of Greek at Marischal College in Aberdeen. He was given an honorary doctorate (DD) in 1834.

In 1843 he left the established Church of Scotland and joined the Free Church. He retained his professorship at Aberdeen. In 1846 he was elected Moderator of the General Assembly in succession to Rev Patrick MacFarlan. He was succeeded in turn in 1847 by the Rev James Sievewright.

He died at home, 19 Golden Square in Aberdeen on 7 December 1872 and was buried beside his wife at Nellfied Cemetery.

Family
He married 26 April 1828, Jane (died s.p. 1 January 1854, aged 65), daughter of William Stronach, minister of Marnoch.

Bibliography
Aberdeen Journal Notes and Queries, ii. 139, iv. 205
Records of Marischal College, ii. 49 [where the date of his marriage is wrongly given as 14 September 1829]
Memorial in Greyfriars United Free Church, Aberdeen [where the date of his death is erroneously given as 7 October] 
Aberdeen Free Press, 9 December 1872

Artistic recognition

He was photographed by Hill & Adamson around 1844.

References

Citations

Sources

1792 births
1872 deaths
Clergy from Utrecht (city)
19th-century Ministers of the Free Church of Scotland
Alumni of the University of Aberdeen
Academics of the University of Aberdeen